This is a list of episodes for the third season (1988–89) of the television series Married... with Children.

The third season marked an increase in the show's popularity, based on Terry Rakolta's moral campaign against the show, which began after the episode "Her Cups Runneth Over", in which Al and Steve go to a lingerie store in search of Peggy's favorite bra, which had been discontinued. This season also contains the "Lost Episode" "I'll See You in Court", which was not aired in North America until June 18, 2002, five years after the show's initial run, on the cable channel FX (and was included in the season-three DVD set). Michael Faustino makes his second guest appearance. During the season, the show became the first on Fox to achieve a quarter share of viewership.

Episodes

References

1988 American television seasons
1989 American television seasons
03